The Visual Effects Society Award for Outstanding Special (Practical) Effects in a Photoreal or Animated Project is one of the annual awards given by the Visual Effects Society. The award goes to artists whose work in special/practical effects, have been deemed worthy of recognition. The award has been handed out intermittently since the first VES awards. Only twice was it awarded to television broadcasts or commercials (in 2004 and 2008), and was award for film from 2003 to 2009, with the exception being 2006. It was reintroduced in 2020, awarding any photoreal and/or animated project.

Winners and nominees

2000s

2010s

2020s

External links
 Visual Effects Society

References

P